The Secret (also titled Le Secret) is a 2001 French romantic drama film directed by Virginie Wagon and starring Anne Coesens, Michel Bompoil and Tony Todd.  It is Wagon's feature directorial debut.

Cast
Anne Coesens as Marie
Michel Bompoil as François
Tony Todd as Bill
Frédéric Sauzay as Luc
Jacqueline Jehanneuf as La mère de Marie
Natalya Ermilova as Ana
Valérie Vogt as Séverine
Quentin Rossi as Paul
Aladin Reibel as Rémy

Release
The film was released on August 23, 2001.

Reception
David Parkinson of Radio Times awarded the film three stars out of five.

References

External links